Moster fra Mols is a 1943 Danish family film directed by Poul Bang and starring Rasmus Christiansen.

Plot
A wealthy businessman and his wife deal with gardening troubles and more importantly, their daughter's depression after she has had several romantic problems.

Cast
 Rasmus Christiansen - Fabrikant Palle Nelsøe
 Marie Niedermann - Emma Nelsøe
 Gerda Gilboe - Else Nelsøe
 Inger Stender - Grethe Holst
 Agis Winding - Fru Hansen
 Christian Arhoff - Slagter Hans Nielsen
 Poul Reichhardt - Handelsrejsende Peter Jacobsen
 Carl Fischer - Konstruktør Snuffelbach
 Buster Larsen - Tilskuer

References

External links

1943 films
1940s Danish-language films
Danish black-and-white films
Films directed by Poul Bang
Films directed by Axel Frische
Films directed by Grete Frische
Danish comedy films
1943 comedy films